Assisi is an H chondrite meteorite that fell to earth at 7:00 am on May 24, 1886, in Perugia, Umbria, Italy.

Only one single  stone was found.

Classification
It is an ordinary chondrite and belongs to the petrologic type 5, thus was assigned to the group H5.

See also 
 Glossary of meteoritics
 Meteorite falls
 Ordinary chondrite

References

Meteorites found in Italy
1886 in Italy